Islam Abdullayev (also known as Segah Islam) (December 1876 — 22 September 1964) was an Azerbaijani khananda, Honored Art Worker of the Azerbaijan SSR.

Biography
Islam Abdullayev was born in December, 1876 in Shusha. He received his first education in Shusha. In the history of Azerbaijani music, Islam Abdullayev is known as a unique performer of the Segah mugham.

Music scientist Mir Mohsun Navvab, who created the "Gathering of Singers" in Shusha in 1883 invited I.Abdullayev to this assembly. So he learned from such artists as Mir Mohsun Navvab, Haji Husu, Mashadi Isi, Mirza Mukhtar Mammadov, Dali Ismayil, and Keshtazly Hashim, and performed with the accompany of Sadigjan. The first Segah performance by Islam Abdullayev was at the wedding of Sadigjan's son, after this performance he became more famous. In 1901-1905, he performed with Gurban Pirimov in Karabakh and Ganja assemblies.

He was called "Segah Islam" by the people for his special enthusiasm and skillful singing of Segah mugham and its all variants - "Zabul-Segah", "Mirza Huseyn", "Orta Segah" and "Kharij Segah". In 1910-1915, the recording companies "Sport-Record" and "Extrafon" recorded Segah, Bayati-Qajar, Shahnaz, Shushtar and other classifications which performed by Islam Abdullayev on vinyl.

Segah Islam was also a pedagog. He played a great role as a mentor of singers like Khan Shushinski, Yagub Mammadov and Sahib Shukurov. He worked as a director of music school in Shusha and organized an orchestra of folk instruments in Ganja. Shortly before the end of his life he moved to Aghdam, and taught mugham in a music school and became the teacher of many singers.

Islam Abdullayev died on September 22, 1964 in Baku.

Awards
Honored Art Worker of the Azerbaijan SSR — 1949

References

Literature

See also
Shakili Alasgar
Aghabala Abdullayev
Gasim Abdullayev

1876 births
1964 deaths
20th-century Azerbaijani male singers
Azerbaijani folk singers
Musicians from Shusha